Mission San Francisco Solano was a Spanish mission established March 1, 1700 by Fray Antonio de Olivares.

The approximate present day location of the mission's archaeological site is in the Municipality of Guerrero. 

Franciscan missionaries Antonio de Olivares and Francisco Hidalgo were present at the founding. The Native American people brought into the mission were primarily Terocodame and Xarame. Payaya Indians had been among the indigenous converts baptized at the mission by the year 1706.

Sources
Barr, Juliana. Peace Came in the Form of a Woman. Chapel Hill: University of North Carolina Press, 2007.

References

1700 establishments in New Spain
Archaeological sites in Coahuila
History of Coahuila
San Francisco Solano
Spanish Colonial architecture in Mexico